TV Party is the fourth EP by American band Black Flag, released in 1982. It was self-produced with Ed Barton and originally released by SST Records on the 7" vinyl format. The title track is a satire of boredom, drinking and America's obsession with television; the original version was also released on the band's 1981 album Damaged.

Production

The song "TV Party" was recorded three times. To promote the Damaged album in the United States, Unicorn Records had Black Flag enter the studio and re-record the song for the EP in March 1982, with their then-new drummer Emil Johnson. The EP version features a slower tempo and hand claps. The band again recorded the song at the request of Alex Cox, for his 1984 cult classic film Repo Man and the accompanying soundtrack. Each version of the song lyrically references different TV shows from the era in which each recording was made.

Style
"TV Party" is driven by Chuck Dukowski's bass line and features Henry Rollins on lead vocals and bellowed backing vocals from band members. The song is light in comparison to other songs from the band's Damaged era. Black Flag guitarist Greg Ginn has stated that after "Rollins joined the band, we couldn't do songs with a sense of humor anymore; he got into the serious way-out poet thing."  Rollins described the song as satire, stating "it's about people who stay inside their house and live in a TV kinda world. And this has a very direct effect on us." Ginn echoed Rollins's interpretation, stating "It's basically a satire of people watching TV and partying at home, which is a sickness which is very prevalent in LA."
Glen E. Friedman referred to the song as "a parody of certain type of people". Comparing the song to the Beastie Boys' "(You Gotta) Fight for Your Right (To Party!)", he stated "They were both parodies that people took too seriously, and even the bands were found taking themselves too seriously after the fact."

Release
The TV Party EP was released in July 1982. To promote the EP, a music video of "TV Party" was shot featuring the members of Black Flag and their friends drinking beer and calling out their favorite television shows in front of a television set. Among the members is photographer (and the video's director) Glen E. Friedman. Target Video also released a home video titled TV Party, in 1983, containing live footage of the group from 1980 and 1982 as well as the video of the title track.  There have been several variations on the release of the TV Party EP. They include one released by SST Records, one as a split between SST and Unicorn Records, and another simply by Unicorn. All three versions have the same track listing. Several different slip covers were also issued. A new version of the song "TV Party" later appeared on the soundtrack to the film Repo Man (1984). In the film, Emilio Estevez can be heard singing "TV Party". The song also appears on other compilation albums.

Reception
The title song of the EP received praise from music critics. Online music database Allmusic gave a positive review of the song, describing it as "at once cutting and funny, an attack on television-inspired stasis that laughs both at and with its subjects" and "As a dumb anthem, it even beats out the band's cover of "Louie Louie". Spin referred to the song as the "greatest ode to the slacker sloth".

In 1982, Billboard listed the song "TV Party" as "Recommended" in their "Top Singles" review section. The website AllMusic would later give the EP a retrospective rating of two and a half stars out of five, stating that "The other tracks are good, but this is a release for collectors or serious fans only."

Track listing

Personnel

Black Flag     
 Henry Rollins – lead vocals
 Greg Ginn – lead guitar, composer
 Dez Cadena – rhythm guitar, vocals
 Chuck Dukowski – bass
 Emil Johnson – drums (side 1)
 Bill Stevenson – drums (side 2)

Production and design
 Ed Barton – producer
 Black Flag – producer
 Jeff Stebbins – engineer
 Glen E. Friedman – photography

Charts

Notes

 
 
 

1982 albums
Black Flag (band) EPs
SST Records EPs